The 2018 New Holland Canadian Junior Curling Championships was held from January 13 to 21 at the Aréna Grand-Mère and the Centre municipal de curling de Shawinigan in Shawinigan, Québec. The winners represented Canada at the 2018 World Junior Curling Championships in Aberdeen, Scotland.

Men

Round-robin standings
Final round-robin standings

Championship Pool Standings
Final round-robin standings

Playoffs

Semifinal
Saturday, January 20, 18:00

Final
Sunday, January 21, 18:00

Women

Round-robin standings
Final round-robin standings

Championship Pool Standings
Final round-robin standings

Playoffs

Semifinal
Saturday, January 20, 13:00

Final
Sunday, January 21, 13:00

Qualification

Ontario
The Ontario U21 Provincial Championships were held December 27–30, 2017 at the Annandale Golf & Curling Club in Ajax.

Results:

Playoffs
Men's semifinal: Hall 8-4 Leung
Men's final: Hall 7-2 Willsey
Women's tiebreaker: Little 6-4 Steele
Women's semifinal: Wallingford 8-4 Little
Women's final: Wallingford 8-6 Murphy

References

External links
Official Website 

Junior Championships
Curling competitions in Quebec
Shawinigan
Canadian Junior Curling Championships
2018 in Quebec
January 2018 sports events in Canada